Epischnia aspergella is a species of snout moth in the genus Epischnia. It was described by Émile Louis Ragonot in 1887, and is known from China.

References

Moths described in 1887
Phycitini